Simitar Entertainment, Inc. was an American media company that sold music, videos, DVDs, and computer software. The company specialized in compilation albums, special interest video, and urban media. Simitar also distributed its own label.

History 

In 1985, Mickey Elfenbein, former president and CEO of K-Tel International, and Philip Kives (K-tel founder), after K-Tel just went to bankruptcy in October 1984, started Simitar Entertainment. The first film released by Simitar was the children's film Shinbone Alley, which was retailed at $39.95, and a soundtrack album would be marketed through television commercials. Simitar bought Pickwick Records. Simitar was a long-time leader in budget VHS throughout the 80s and early 90s.

In 1986, Simitar Entertainment had reached a deal with the United States Hot Rod Association to bring and promote its home video title Monster Madness. By 1987, Minnesota-based Wedding Information Services had inked an agreement with Simitar Entertainment, whereas Simitar would release several titles on videocassette to mass merchandise and their video stores. Reach Entertainment produced sports home video programs for Simitar.

In 1991, Simitar scored a hit with the title Desert Shield, a documentary on the Gulf War. On February 25, 1997, Simitar Entertainment had distributed the six-part documentary series Hollywood Starlets, produced by Promotions Plus in cooperation with Orphen Enterprises, which primarily focused on B-movie actresses. By April, 1997 Simitar was the first independent in the U.S. with DVD releases. On May 18, 1998, Simitar licensed the rights to 14 Jackie Chan movies, and several Godzilla movies to bring it onto DVD release, under license from United Productions of America, then-U.S. holder of the franchise. In 1999, Simitar's revenues rose from $5 million to $40 million in just three years.

On March 9, 1999, Titan Sports, Inc.—the parent company of the World Wrestling Federation (WWF)– and its music licensee, The Cherry River Music Co., sued Simitar Entertainment for copyright infringement relating to WWF The Music, Vol. 3 and won. Subsequently, in 2000, Simitar folded due to problems in the music division; the company's total assets were $19,570,059, with debts of $25,556,878.  Simitar auctioned off its assets later that year, including its film library, which sold to Brentwood Communications, Inc. (BCI) for $215,000.  Ed Goetz and Greg Glass went to BCI to start a DVD division. In October/November 2003, BCI was purchased by Navarre Corporation. Naverre's assets have since been sold to Speed Commerce in 2012, then to WYNIT Distribution in 2014. Following the bankruptcy of WYNIT in 2017, Sereno Holdings acquired most of the company assets and relaunched Navarre Distribution as "Encore Software", and it is currently this "new" Encore which owns Simitar and the other former BCI labels.

Simitar releases 
5th Day of Peace, American Bullfighters 1 & 2
Abraxas, Guardian of the Universe
Anima Mundi
Awesome Rides
Awesome Airplanes
Bleeders
BMX Freestyle
Body Armor
The Boys Club
Canyon Dreams: Tangerine Dream
Canyon Dreams/Desert Vision/True North
Car Funnies
Cartel
Cause of Death
The Christmas Light
The Christmas Brigade
Chronos
Dead & Buried
The Dude Gang
Fearless Hyena
Frankenhooker
God Told Me To
Godzilla, King of the Monsters!
Godzilla's Revenge
(Godzilla vs.) Monster Zero
Godzilla vs. Mothra (DVD / VHS)
Godzilla vs. the Smog Monster (VHS only)
Grambling's White Tiger
Greatest Hits (SWV album)
The Hitchhiker's Guide to the Galaxy
I Wanna be a Policeman 
Jets
Jack Frost
Jungle Boy
Kamikaze in Colour
Korean War in Colour
Laurel & Hardy Classics
Mind Meld
Mob War
Mysteries of the Sphinx
Mysterious Origins of Man
Porsche
The Real Untouchables
Red Scorpion
Rush Week
Search and Destroy
Serial Killers
Spplat Attack
Strike Fighters
Surgeon
Story of a War (Story of Iran-Iraq (1980–1988) war part1–5, P: Ramel Inc./Simitar Entertainment Inc. 1989) Story of Iran-Iraq (1980-1988) war part1
Terror of Mechagodzilla
To Kill With Intrigue
Two Evil Eyes
Vampires (VHS only)
Venom
Vitsie Video Sitter
Voodoo
Wings Of Thunder
Werewolf 
Wheels of Thunder 
Women Unchained

Bob Hope 
The Road to Rio
The Great Lover
The Road to Bali
The Seven Little Foys
How to Commit Marriage
The Lemon Drop Kid
Son of Paleface
Paris Holiday
The Private Navy of Sgt. O'Farrell

References

Mass media companies established in 1985
Mass media companies disestablished in 2000
1985 establishments in Minnesota
2000 disestablishments in Minnesota
Home video companies of the United States
Defunct companies based in Minnesota